Zombie Wars is a 2007 American war horror film written and directed by David A. Prior.  It stars Adam Mayfield, Alissa Koenig, Jim Marlow, and Kristi Renee Pearce as humans struggling against zombie overlords.

Premise 
After a zombie apocalypse, humanity becomes enslaved by zombies.  Bred in captivity for food, these humans receive no education or training.  Bands of free humans work to free the captives and turn the tide against the zombies.

Cast 
 Adam Mayfield as David
 Alissa Koenig as Star
 Jim Marlow as Brian
 Kristi Renee Pearce as General
 Jonathan Badeen as Sliver
 Billy Hayes as George

Release 
A trailer was released in November 2006.  On March 15, 2009, Zombie Wars played at the first Paranoia Horror Film Festival.

Reception 
Scott Foy of Dread Central rated the film 3/5 stars and called it "a fun little piece of pulp action horror – a modern day drive-in movie, breezy and cheesy, but done so with an unmistakable enthusiasm."

David Walker of DVD Talk rated the film 1/5 stars and said, "Zombie Wars is not a terrible film in the sense that it is not completely unwatchable. It is, however, a terrible film in that the script is bad, the direction is lackluster, the acting is marginal and the premise, which has hints of Planet of the Apes, is laughable in its execution."

Peter Dendle wrote that the film is "conceptually ambitious" but dragged down by its poor writing, acting, and production values.

References

Works cited 
 Dendle, Peter (2012). The Zombie Movie Encyclopedia: Volume 2, 2000-2010.  North Carolina: McFarland Publishing. .

External links 
 

2007 films
2007 independent films
2000s science fiction horror films
American independent films
American zombie films
American post-apocalyptic films
Direct-to-video horror films
Films directed by David A. Prior
American science fiction horror films
American exploitation films
American splatter films
2000s English-language films
2000s American films